Colonel Sir Neil Gordon Thorne,  (born 8 August 1932) is a British Conservative Party politician. He contested the constituency of Ilford South six times from October 1974 to 1997, and was the Member of Parliament for the seat from 1979 to 1992, when he lost by 402 votes to Labour's Mike Gapes.

Biography

Thorne served in the Territorial Army Royal Artillery, reaching the rank of lieutenant colonel. In 1989, he founded the Armed Forces Parliamentary Scheme, which aims to improve the quality of debate on military issues, and does this by exposing Members of Parliament to first-hand experience of the armed forces.

Thorne is a member of the Steering Group Committee for the British Chinese Armed Forces Heritage project which started in 2015. This is a joint project in collaboration between the Ming-Ai (London) Institute and Regent's University London. Thorne is a freemason, and was Provincial Grand Master of Essex Freemasons for ten years from 1995 to 2005.

In 2018, Thorne attracted media criticism for his application for planning permission to relocate a statue of Emmeline Pankhurst. Suffragettes raised funds and twice negotiated the site of the statue in 1930 and 1956, when the government also attempted to remove the statue. The proposed site in Regent's University London has no link to Pankhurst or suffragette history.

Honours

 Sir Neil Thorne also serves as a deputy lieutenant for the London Borough of Brent, allowing him the Post Nominal Letters "DL" for Life.

 He was appointed as the Honorary Colonel of the University of Leeds Officers' Training Corps on 8 August 1999.

Footnotes

References
Times Guide to the House of Commons, 1992 and 1997 editions

1932 births
Living people
Conservative Party (UK) MPs for English constituencies
UK MPs 1979–1983
UK MPs 1983–1987
UK MPs 1987–1992
Knights Bachelor
Royal Artillery officers
Officers of the Order of the British Empire
Freemasons of the United Grand Lodge of England
British special constables
Deputy Lieutenants
Knights of Justice of the Order of St John